SMS Erzherzog Ferdinand Max was the lead ship of the  of broadside ironclads built for the Austrian Navy in the 1860s. She was built by the Stabilimento Tecnico Triestino, with her keel laying in October 1863, launching in May 1865, and commissioning in June 1866 at the outbreak of the Third Italian War of Independence and the Austro-Prussian War, fought concurrently. The ship was armed with a main battery of sixteen 48-pounder guns, though the rifled guns originally intended, which had been ordered from Prussia, had to be replaced with old smoothbore guns until after the conflicts ended.

Stationed in the Adriatic Sea, Erzherzog Ferdinand Max served as the flagship of the Austrian fleet under Rear Admiral Wilhelm von Tegetthoff. She saw action at the Battle of Lissa in July 1866, where she rammed and sank the Italian ironclad . Slightly damaged in the collision, Erzherzog Ferdinand Max had her bow repaired in Malta after the war. She remained in the Austro-Hungarian fleet for the next twenty years, but severely reduced naval budgets owing to Hungarian disinterest in naval matters led to an uneventful career. She was rearmed with newer guns in 1874 and again in 1882. Stricken from the naval register in May 1886, Erzherzog Ferdinand Max was employed as a tender to the gunnery training school from 1889 to 1908. She remained in the inventory until 1916 when she was broken up for scrap.

Design

She displaced . She had a crew of 511 officers and enlisted men. Her propulsion system consisted of one single-expansion steam engine, manufactured by the Stabilimento Tecnico shipyard in Fiume, that drove a single screw propeller. The number and type of her coal-fired boilers have not survived, but they were vented through a single funnel located amidships.

Erzherzog Ferdinand Max was a broadside ironclad, and she was armed with a main battery of sixteen 48-pounder muzzle-loading guns, eight guns per broadside. She also carried several smaller guns, including four 8-pounder guns and two 3-pounders.

Service history
Erzherzog Ferdinand Max was laid down at the Stabilimento Tecnico Triestino shipyard in Trieste on 6 May 1863. She was launched on 24 May 1865; the builders were forced to complete fitting-out work quickly, as tensions with neighboring Prussia and Italy erupted into the concurrent Austro-Prussian War and the Third Italian War of Independence in June 1866. Erzherzog Ferdinand Maxs rifled heavy guns were still on order from Krupp, and they could not be delivered due to the conflict with Prussia. Instead, the ship was armed with old smooth-bore guns. Rear Admiral Wilhelm von Tegetthoff, the commander of the Austrian Fleet, immediately began to mobilize his fleet. As the ships became fully crewed, they began to conduct training exercises in Fasana. With his flag aboard Erzherzog Ferdinand Max, Tegetthoff brought the Austrian fleet to Ancona on 26 June in an attempt to draw out the Italians, but the Italian commander, Admiral Carlo Pellion di Persano, refused to engage Tegetthoff. Tegetthoff made another sortie on 6 July, but again could not bring the Italian fleet to battle.

Battle of Lissa

On 16 July, Persano took the Italian fleet, with twelve ironclads, out of Ancona, bound for the island of Lissa, where they arrived on the 18th. With them, they brought troop transports carrying 3,000 soldiers. Persano then spent the next two days bombarding the Austrian defenses of the island and unsuccessfully attempting to force a landing. Tegetthoff received a series of telegrams between the 17 and 19 July notifying him of the Italian attack, which he initially believed to be a feint to draw the Austrian fleet away from its main bases at Pola and Venice. By the morning of the 19th, however, he was convinced that Lissa was in fact the Italian objective, and so he requested permission to attack. As Tegetthoff's fleet arrived off Lissa on the morning of 20 July, Persano's fleet was arrayed for another landing attempt. The latter's ships were divided into three groups, with only the first two able to concentrate in time to meet the Austrians. Tegetthoff had arranged his ironclad ships into a wedge-shaped formation, leading with Erzherzog Ferdinand Max at the center; the wooden warships of the second and third divisions followed behind in the same formation.

While he was forming up his ships, Persano transferred from his flagship, to the turret ship . This created a gap in the Italian line, and Tegetthoff seized the opportunity to divide the Italian fleet and create a melee. He made a pass through the gap, but failed to ram any of the Italian ships, forcing him to turn around and make another attempt. During the second attempt, Austrian gunfire had disabled Re d'Italias rudder, leaving her incapable of maneuvering. Tegetthoff seized the opportunity to ram the Italian vessel, and ordered his ship to maximum speed. After two collisions that occurred at angles too oblique to inflict serious damage, Erzherzog Ferdinand Max struck the ship more directly. The Austrian ship's ram tore a gaping hole in Re d'Italias hull on the port side, though Erzherzog Ferdinand Max sustained no significant damage herself. Tegetthoff reversed course, allowing the Italian ironclad to lurch back to port and quickly sink. Tegetthoff initially ordered his crew to lower boats to pick up the Italians struggling in the water, but the Italian ironclad  was approaching, and he could not allow his ship to become a stationary target. Instead, he ordered the aviso  to remain behind and pick up the survivors while Erzherzog Ferdinand Max engaged San Martino. The other Italian ships, however, did not realize Kaiserin Elizabeth was attempting to pick up the Italian survivors, and so opened fire on her, driving her away from the men in the water.

By this time, the coastal defense ship  was burning badly, soon to be destroyed by a magazine explosion. Persano broke off the engagement, having lost two ships, and though his squadron still outnumbered the Austrians, he refused to counter-attack with his badly demoralized forces. In addition, the fleet was low on coal and ammunition. The Italian fleet began to withdraw, followed by the Austrians; Tegetthoff, having gotten the better of the action, kept his distance so as not to risk his success. Additionally, the Austrian ships were slower than their Italian counterparts, and so they could not force a second engagement. As night began to fall, the opposing fleets disengaged completely, heading for Ancona and Pola, respectively. Erzherzog Ferdinand Max had fired 156 shells in the course of the battle. She had kept boarding parties on her deck, ready to attack Italian vessels, but the opportunity had not presented itself in the engagement; steam-powered ships could simply reverse course and disengage before a boarding party could cross over. Erzherzog Ferdinand Max was not significantly damaged by Italian fire or the ramming attempts. A few armor plates were slightly dislodged, the paint had been stripped from the hull where she had collided with Re d'Italia, and she had a minor leak from the concussion, but she was otherwise unscathed.

Later career
After returning to Pola, Tegetthoff kept his fleet in the northern Adriatic, where it patrolled against a possible Italian attack. The Italian ships never came, and on 12 August, the two countries signed the Armistice of Cormons; this ended the fighting and led to the Treaty of Vienna. Though Austria had defeated Italy at Lissa and on land at the Battle of Custoza, the Austrian army was decisively defeated by Prussia at the Battle of Königgrätz. With the war over, Erzherzog Ferdinand Max went into the British Royal Navy shipyard in Malta to have her bow repaired. As a result of Austria's defeat, Kaiser Franz Joseph was forced to accede to Hungarian demands for greater autonomy, and the country became Austria-Hungary in the Ausgleich of 1867. The two halves of the Dual Monarchy held veto power over the other, and Hungarian disinterest in naval expansion led to severely reduced budgets for the fleet. In the immediate aftermath of the war, the bulk of the Austrian fleet was decommissioned and disarmed.

In 1869, Kaiser Franz Joseph took a tour of the Mediterranean Sea in his imperial yacht ; Erzherzog Ferdinand Max, her sister ship , and a pair of paddle steamers escorted the Kaiser for the trip to Port Said at the mouth of the Suez Canal. The two ironclads remained in the Mediterranean while the other vessels passed through the Canal into the Red Sea in company with Empress Eugenie of France aboard her own yacht. The Austro-Hungarian ships eventually returned to Trieste in December. In 1874 she was rearmed with a battery of fourteen  muzzle-loading Armstrong guns and four light guns. Her battery was revised again in 1882, with the addition of four  breech-loader guns, two  breech-loaders, a pair of  quick-firing revolver guns, and three  auto-cannons. Erzherzog Ferdinand Max was stricken from the naval register on 19 May 1886 and her armament was reduced to eight  guns. The following year, these were removed and a single  gun and a  gun were installed. From 1889 to 1908, she served as a tender to the gunnery training school. The ship was ultimately broken up for scrap in 1916 during World War I.

Notes

References
 
 
 

1865 ships
Erzherzog Ferdinand Max-class ironclads